Abz or ABZ may refer to:

 Abz Love, English singer and former member of boy band Five
 Abui language, a Trans-New Guinean language of Indonesia
 IATA code for Aberdeen Airport, an international airport, located in Aberdeen, Scotland
 Abr (also known as Abz), a village in Semnan Province, Iran
 Albendazole, a drug for the treatment of worm infestations
 Asian Boyz, an Asian American gang